The Oudola is a stringed musical instrument. It is said to have been custom-built for Agapios Tomboulis, according to
his own specifications. He combined the words oud and mandola, and named it oudola.

See also

 Bouzouki
 Pandura
 Tambouras
 Cretan lyra
 Tzouras

References

Greek music
Greek musical instruments
Armenian music
Armenian musical instruments
Necked bowl lutes
Greek inventions